The 2022 Murcia Open was a professional tennis tournament played on clay courts. It was the 3rd edition of the tournament which was part of the 2022 ATP Challenger Tour. It took place in Murcia, Spain, between 4 and 10 April 2022.

Singles main-draw entrants

Seeds

 1 Rankings are as of 21 March 2022.

Other entrants
The following players received wildcards into the singles main draw:
  Ivan Gakhov
  Carlos Gimeno Valero
  Carlos Sánchez Jover

The following players received entry from the qualifying draw:
  Ulises Blanch
  Miguel Damas
  Michael Geerts
  Oleksii Krutykh
  Daniel Mérida Aguilar
  Rudolf Molleker

The following player received entry as a lucky loser:
  Christopher Heyman

Champions

Singles

  Tseng Chun-hsin def.  Norbert Gombos 6–4, 6–1.

Doubles

  Íñigo Cervantes /  Oriol Roca Batalla def.  Pedro Cachín /  Martín Cuevas 6–7(4–7), 7–6(7–4), [10–7].

References

2022 ATP Challenger Tour
2022 in Spanish tennis
April 2022 sports events in Spain